The Gunning Wind Farm project is a wind farm development in the Cullerin Range, north-east of Gunning, in New South Wales. Wind turbines in the farm are visible from the Hume Highway. 

The Gunning Wind Farm comprises an electrical substation and operation and maintenance facilities plus 31 turbines which send power to the substation via 17km of underground cabling.
A 14km-long 132kV transmission line was constructed to connect the wind farm to the 132kV Yass-Goulburn transmission line. Turbines generate electricity at 12kV which travels via underground cables to the substation where it is stepped up to 132kV to match the grid voltage.
Construction began in April 2010 and created about 100 jobs, bringing significant economic activity to the Gunning region. The wind farm was completed in May 2011.
A great deal of work was done prior to development of the wind farm. Technical studies identified constraints and the best design, with independent consultants engaged to report on:
 flora and fauna
 cultural heritage
 traffic and transport
 geology and hydrology
 landscape and visual amenity
 sound

The wind farm is capable of producing 46.5MW of clean, renewable energy.
Each of the 1.5MW turbines at the Gunning Wind Farm can provide sufficient renewable energy to power approximately 750 homes and save more than 5,250 tonnes of greenhouse gas emissions a year.
The 31 turbines can power 35,000 homes annually and save more than 162,750 tonnes of greenhouse gases a year.

See also
 Cullerin Range Wind Farm

References

External links

Wind farms in New South Wales
Gunning, New South Wales